Edenton Cotton Mill Historic District is a national historic district located at Edenton, Chowan County, North Carolina. The district encompasses 70 contributing buildings, 1 contributing site, 2 contributing structures, and 1 contributing object in a small mill village. It includes industrial and residential buildings developed between 1899 and 1923. Residential buildings are primarily simple one-story, single-pile, frame dwellings and some examples of the Bungalow / American Craftsman style. Notable non-residential buildings include the Italianate Revival style Edenton Cotton Mill (1899-1916), Edenton Cotton Mill Office, and First Christian Church (1916).

It was listed on the National Register of Historic Places in 1999.

References

External links 

 Guide to the Edenton Cotton Mill Collection

Historic districts on the National Register of Historic Places in North Carolina
Italianate architecture in North Carolina
Industrial buildings completed in 1916
Buildings and structures in Chowan County, North Carolina
National Register of Historic Places in Chowan County, North Carolina